Sir Richard Burbidge, 1st Baronet (2 March 1847 – 31 May 1917) was an English merchant.

Biography
He was born in Wiltshire, educated at Devizes and Melksham, and at the age of 13 was apprenticed to a provision merchant in Oxford Street, London, afterwards starting in business as a provision merchant at the age of 19. Fourteen years later he became general superintendent of the Army and Navy Auxiliary Stores. In 1882 he was appointed general manager of Whiteley's, Westbourne Grove, and in 1891 entered the service of Harrods, Brompton Road, of which he was afterwards managing director. By 1916, he had increased its profits from £16,000 to over £200,000, and it had become one of the largest of the London stores. He also did a good deal to ensure shorter working hours for shop assistants.

Burbidge was the “private citizen” who anonymously presented about £30,000 to the fund for acquiring the Crystal Palace for the public in 1913. During World War I, he was responsible for the building and fitting up of two hospitals in Belgium, and was a member of many government committees, including the advisory committee of the Ministry of Munitions and the committee of inquiry into the Royal Aircraft workings, of which he was chairman.

He was created a baronet in 1916 (see Burbidge baronets). He died in London.

Notes

References

1847 births
1917 deaths
Baronets in the Baronetage of the United Kingdom
19th-century British philanthropists
19th-century British businesspeople